Conor Terence Murphy (Irish: Conchúr Ó Murchú; born 10 July 1963) is an Irish republican Sinn Féin politician who is the Member of the Legislative Assembly of Northern Ireland for Newry and Armagh. He served as the Member of Parliament for Newry and Armagh from 2005 until 2015.

Early life 
Murphy was born in Camlough, South Armagh and joined the Provisional Irish Republican Army (IRA) during the 1981 hunger strikes. In 1982 he was sentenced to five years in prison for IRA membership and possession of explosives.

Political career 
Between 1989 and 1997, he was a Sinn Féin councillor on Newry and Mourne District Council for The Fews area, in South Armagh and South Down, and served as his party's group leader at that level.

Assembly elections
In 1998, Murphy was elected as one of his party's two Northern Ireland Assembly members for Newry and Armagh. He was re-elected, with two party colleagues, to the Assembly in 2003. He lives in Camlough, County Armagh with his wife Catherine, his daughter Áine and his son Oisín. He attended St Colman's College, Newry, Queen's University of Belfast (QUB), and the University of Ulster.

In 2001, he contested the Newry and Armagh Westminster seat, coming second to incumbent Séamus Mallon of the Social Democratic and Labour Party (SDLP). When Mallon decided not to contest the seat again, Murphy became the clear favourite to win and was elected on 5 May 2005.

Abstentionism and tour of UK party conferences
He refused to take his seat in the House of Commons of the United Kingdom in line with the abstentionist policy of Sinn Féin. In the Northern Ireland Assembly, he served as the Minister for Regional Development in the Northern Ireland Executive from 8 May 2007 until 16 May 2011. While on a tour of UK party conferences in autumn 2005, he became the first Irish republican to address the Conservative Party conference and caused controversy by refusing to express regret over the Brighton hotel bombing.

Tribunal over appointment of head of Northern Ireland Water
In 2011, while Minister for Regional Development, Murphy appointed Seán Hogan, a Catholic, as head of Northern Ireland Water, turning down the applications of four Protestants on the shortlist. A tribunal subsequently awarded £150,000 damages for discrimination to one of these applicants, Alan Lennon, judging that Hogan was appointed because "he was not from a Protestant background and because he was known to the minister and his (then Sinn Fein) ministerial colleagues Michelle Gildernew and Caitríona Ruane, who were consulted about the appointment." The tribunal found Murphy's evidence was "implausible and lack[ing] credibility", and that, during Murphy's tenure at the Department for Regional Development, there was a "material bias against the appointment of candidates from a Protestant background". Murphy disputed the finding which he said branded him "sectarian". Deputy First Minister of Northern Ireland Martin McGuinness defended him, claiming Murphy doesn't have "a sectarian bone in his body".

Witness in Declan Gormley case
In December 2012, Murphy appeared as a witness at Belfast High Court in the case of Declan Gormley, whom Murphy had sacked in 2010 from his post as a non-executive director of NI Water. Gormley sued Sinn Féin over two press releases which he argued were defamatory. Gormley was subsequently offered  £80,000 in damages.

Controversy over comments about Paul Quinn
In 2007, shortly after the murder of Paul Quinn, Conor Murphy said in an interview with Spotlight that "Paul Quinn was involved with smuggling and criminality and I think that everyone accepts that."

During the 2020 Irish general election Conor Murphys' comments were a point of discussion. Breege Quinn said that her son was definitely not involved in criminality and called on Conor Murphy to withdraw his remarks and make a public apology to the Quinn family. On 6 February 2020 Conor Murphy spoke to RTÉ and said that he had withdrawn the remarks he had made in 2007 and apologised to the Quinn family. Breege Quinn repeated her call for him to resign as Minister for Finance at Stormont. She said he "should finish off and get justice" for the Quinn family. She said he should "go and tell the PSNI and the Gardaí exactly who he was speaking to" in the IRA after the murder. She said she would not meet Conor Murphy until he "comes out publicly saying that he is going to the PSNI to give the names of the IRA that he spoke to in Cullyhanna".

References

External links
Sinn Féin official biography

1963 births
Alumni of Queen's University Belfast
Irish republicans
Irish republicans imprisoned under Prevention of Terrorism Acts
Living people
Members of the Parliament of the United Kingdom for Newry and Armagh (since 1983)
Members of Newry and Mourne District Council
Ministers of Finance and Personnel of Northern Ireland
Ministers of the Northern Ireland Executive (since 1999)
Northern Ireland MLAs 1998–2003
Northern Ireland MLAs 2003–2007
Northern Ireland MLAs 2007–2011
Northern Ireland MLAs 2011–2016
Northern Ireland MLAs 2016–2017
Northern Ireland MLAs 2017–2022
People from County Armagh
Provisional Irish Republican Army members
Sinn Féin councillors in Northern Ireland
Sinn Féin MLAs
Sinn Féin MPs (post-1921)
UK MPs 2005–2010
UK MPs 2010–2015
Northern Ireland MLAs 2022–2027